The Trófeu Raça Negra (Black Race Trophy) is a Brazilian award which is handed out to individuals and groups who have contributed or exhibited advancements for Afro-Brazilians. Organized by the NGO Afrobras, it was first handed out in 2000 on the 500th anniversary of the European arrival in Brazil, and has been held annually since 2004. It is similar to the NAACP Image Award in the United States.

Recipients

2020
 Luiz Melodia – singer-songwriter (posthumous)
 George Floyd – American victim of police brutality whose murder sparked international protests (posthumous)
 Benedita da Silva – politician
 Celso Athayde – entrepreneur and event producer
 Emicida – singer-songwriter, rapper
 Jaqueline Goes de Jesus – Biomedicalist and researcher
 Luana Génot – businesswoman and activist
 Luís Roberto Barroso – jurist, current Justice of the Supreme Federal Court, President of the Superior Electoral Court
 Luiza Helena Trajano –businesswoman
 Paulo César de Oliveira – former football referee
 Viviane Ferreira – filmmaker

2019
 Raul Botelho – the first black Air Force Lieutenant Brigadier and the first Commander of the Joint Staff of the Defense Ministry, the Lieutenant Brigadier.
 Érika Malunguinho – the first trans state deputy elected in Brazil, in 2018. She is also known for having created the Quilombo Urbano named Aparelha Luzia in the center of the capital.
 Dr. Pedro Luiz Sousa – delegate responsible for the arrest of the torturers of the young black man at the Ricoy Supermarket.
 Alexandra Lohas – prominent journalist and activist in 2019, former French consul.
 Miguel Haddad – federal deputy. Former mayor and pioneer in the implementation of municipal quotas for the city of Jundiaí, serving as a model for other municipalities in Brazil.
 Ricardo John – together with Zumbi, he developed the book Caixa Preta, Leão de Ouro in Cannes and institutes targets for hiring young black people at the Agency.
 Rodrigo Tortima – director of Agência Gray and directors Adriano Matos, Gustavo Zordan and students from Faculdade Zumbi dos Palmares, Vanessa Holanda, Klesley Alves, Mayra Sales and Alex Andre – together with Faculdade Zumbi launched the Machado de Assis Real Campaign, from rescue of the blackness of the great Black Writer, the campaign was awarded gold at Cannes.
 Andrea Assef – together with Zumbi, she launched the book Caixa Petra in the appreciation and visibility of the historical achievements of black people, won gold at Cannes, Director of the Thompson Agency.
 Flávia Lima – journalist, black woman occupying the post of Ombudsman of the Folha de São Paulo newspaper.
 Jacquelin Jules, Deniel Pierrot, Chrisner Louis and Evens Alce – young black Haitians (interns at Zumbi dos Palmares) hired at Banco Bradesco.
 Paulo Roberto Vieira da Silva – physician.
 João Acaiabe – actor, storyteller, one of our greatest griots, the master.
 Dexter – rapper

2018
 Marielle Franco – politician (posthumous)
 Mano Brown – rapper
 Valéria Lúcia dos Santos – lawyer
 Otávio Frias Filho – newspaper editor (posthumous)
 Dias Toffoli – president of the Federal Supreme Court
 Fafá de Belém – singer
 Maria Inês Fini – president of the Instituto Nacional de Estudos e Pesquisas Educacionais Anísio Teixeira
 José Gregori – former Justice minister
 Rilma Aparecida Hemetério – current judge of the Regional Labor Courts in São Paulo
 Teresa Cárdenas – Cuban writer
 Gaby Amarantos – singer
 Reinaldo – singer
 Luiz Carlos Trabuco – former president of Bradesco Bank
 Luiza Trajano – businesswoman
 Adama Dieng – former UN Special Adviser on the Prevention of Genocide

2017
 Zica Assis, founder of Beleza Natural
 Dr. Karen Eloise de Andrade Firne, first student at the Department of Medicine of Jundiaí
 Major Helena dos Santos Reis, First black secretary of the Casa Militar and State Coordinator of Civil Defense of the state of São Paulo
 Paulo Rogério Nunes, Publicity)
 Floriano Pesaro, representative of the Jewish community
 Marco Pellegrini, National Secretary for the disabled
 Ivan Renato de Lima, regional mayor of the neighborhood of Pirituba
 Luiz Melodia, singer (posthumous)
 João Saad, president of the Bandeirantes group
 Ícaro Silva Silva, actor
 Marcelo Knobel, dean of Unicamp (university)
 Marco Antônio Zago, dean of USP
 Maurício de Sousa, cartoonist
 Dandara Mariana, actress and dancer
 Rachel Maia, CEO of Pandora Brasil
 Ismael Ivo, Head of the ballet of the Municipal Theater of São Paulo
 Maria Helena Guimarães, of the Ministry of Education
 Jorge Carlos Fonseca, President of Cape Verde.
 Zezé Motta, actress
 João Doria, Mayor of São Paulo

The 2017 award to João Doria, however, was accompanied with controversy in the Afro-Brazilian community and press. Doria is a descendant of slave-owners in the Doria family, and his actions as mayor against touchstones of Afro-Brazilian culture such as samba and Carnaval have been perceived as racist.

2016
 Elza Soares, singer
 Carmen Lúcia, President of the Federal Supreme Court
 Arlindo Cruz, singer
 Raul Botelho, Lieutenant-Brigadier of Air, Brazilian Air Force
 Papa Paul Kisolokele, Religious leader in Angola
 Kim Cape, GBHEM general secretary - president of the North American investment fund of the Methodist Institute of Educational Services
 Arnaldo Niskier, writer and member of the Brazilian Academy of Letters
 Rafaela Silva, judoka winner of the gold medal in the Rio 2016 Olympics
 Cláudio Lamachia, President of the Federal Council of OAB
 Sheila Cristina Nogueira da Silva, mother of Carlos Eduardo (19 years), murdered by a bullet lost in Rio de Janeiro
 David Uip, Secretary of Health of the State of São Paulo
 Sabrina de Paiva, Miss São Paulo 2016
 Mauro Silva, Champion of the Brazilian National Team and vice-president of the Paulista Football Federation
 Rodney Williams, Vice President of Microsoft Brazil
 Raissa Santana, Miss Brazil 2016
 Francisco Macena, chief of staff of the São Paulo City Hall
 Walter Feldman President of the Paulista Football Federation
 Antônio Mosquito, Angolan businessman

2015
 Marcus Vinicius Furtado Coêlho, President of the National OAB
 Nilcemar Nogueira, Grandson of Cartola and creator of the Samba Museum
 José Alencar de Souza, Chef-owner of the restaurant Santo Colomba
 Maurício Pestana, Secretary for the Promotion of Racial Equality in São Paulo
 João Carlos Martins, Maestro
 Macaé Evaristo, Secretary of Education of the State of Minas Gerais
 Conceição Evaristo - Writer
 Érico Brás, Actor
 Kenia Maria - Actress
 Matheus Dias - Actor 
 Gabriela Dias - Actress
 Lorival Ferreira dos Santos - Judge of the Regional Labor Court (TRT) of Campinas
 Maria Júlia Coutinho - Journalist
 Wole Soyinka - Nigerian Writer, Nobel Prize for Literature
 Martinho da Vila

2014
 Graça Machel, Political activist and human rights defender, widow of Nelson Mandela and Samora Machel
 Tiago Barbosa, actress
 Marcos da Costa, President of the OAB of São Paulo
 Neuza Maria Alves, first black female court judge of the Regional Federal Court of Brasilia
 Nadir de Campos Júnior, first black prosecutor of Justice of the State of São Paulo
 Yityish Aynaw, first Black Miss Israel
 Geraldo Alckmin, Governor of São Paulo
 Fernando Haddad, Mayor of São Paulo
 Antonio Pinto (Secretary of the SEPPIR (pt))
 Luis Gustavo do Nascimento, first black Attorney General of the State of São Paulo
 Vera Eunice (daughter of writer Carolina de Jesus)
 José Henrique Paim (1st Minister of Education)
 Marco Simões (honored from Coca-Cola do Brasil)
 Aranha (goalkeeper of Santos)
 Paulo Speller (dean of Unilab)
 Celso Janet (Secretary of Sports)
 Paulo Reis (Alderman of São Paulo)
 Glaucius Oliva (President of CNPQ)

2013
 Paulina Chiziane, Mozambican writer
 Creuza de Oliveira, president of the FENATRAD union
 Zeze Barbosa, actress
 Paulo Lins, writer
 Irene Neto, President of the Board of Directors of the Agostinho Neto Foundation, daughter of Agostinho Neto
 Larry Robinson, president of the Florida Agricultural and Mechanical University
 Jesse Jackson, U.S. civil rights activist 
 Alpha Condé, first democratically elected president in Guinea
 Emílio Santiago, singer (posthumous)

2012
 Bernice King, daughter of Martin Luther King
 Cacau Protásio, Avenida Brasil
 Jean Paulo Santos, Carousel
 Gloria Maria
 Carlinhos Brown 
 Martinho da Vila
 Racionais MC's
 Macau, composer of the song "Colored Eyes", success in the voice of Sandra de Sá) 
 Renato Sorriso (gari passista)
 Fabiana Claudino - two-time Olympic volleyball champion
 Anderson - Olympic volleyball athlete
 Hélia Souza "Fofão" (Olympic champion of volleyball)
 Luiz Fux (Minister of the "Supreme Federal Court")
 Robson Rocha (vice-president of "Banco do Brasil")
 Otavio Frias Filho (Director of Editorial of the "Folha de São Paulo")
 Bishop Afonso Nunes (Angola)
 Vanda Ferreira (former Secretary of Education of the State of Rio de Janeiro)
 Luís Inácio Lucena Adams (Advocate General of the Union)

2011
 Best Actress - Lucy Ramos (Cordel Encantado - Rede Globo)
 Best Actor - Micael Borges (Rebelde - TV Record)
 Featured Actor - Érico Brás (Tapas & Kisses - Rede Globo) 
 Humorist - Charles Henrique (TV Panic - TV Network)
 Women's Journalism - Dulcinea Novaes - Rede Globo
 Men's Journalism - Thiago Oliveira - TV Gazeta
 Featured in Journalism - Heraldo Pereira - Rede Globo 
 Set of the Work - Nil Marcondes - TV Record
 Black Beauty - Silvia Novaes - Miss Italy Nel Mondo 
 Trophy Homage - Ruth de Souza - actress

2010
 Special Award - Milton Nascimento

Popular Award
 Movie Actor - André Ramiro (Elite Troop 2)
 Movie Actress - Cris Vianna (Beetle)
 Theater - Elisa Lucinda (Stop Talking Badly of Routine)
 Actor of TV - Marcello Melo Jr (Malhação 2010)
 TV Actress - Priscilla Marinho (Fitness ID)
 Journalism - Presenter / Reporter - Heraldo Pereira (Globo)
 Journalism - Presenter / Reporter - Maria Júlia Coutinho (Globo) 
 Music - Group Good Taste

Institutional Awards
 Nationals
 José Antonio Dias Toffoli - Minister of the Supreme Federal Court
 Eloi Ferreira de Araujo - Minister of the Secretariat for Policies for the Promotion of Racial Equality
 Ricardo Lewandowski - President of the Superior Electoral Court and Minister of the Federal Supreme Court
 Antônio Pilar - Director of Core of Rede Globo
 Thogun - Actor
 Marina Miranda - Actress
 Jeferson D - Cinematographer
 
 International
 Ana Paula dos Santos - First Lady of Angola
 David Morgan - Vice President of Government Relations at American Express
 Dr. Jerome King Del Pino - World General Secretary of Methodist Institutions
 Dr. Ken Yamada - Special Assistant to the General Secretariat and in charge of the Methodist Fund for Global Education and Leadership Development

2009

Popular Vote
 Actor of the Year: Rafael Zulu (Caco, de Caras & Bocas, Globo)
 Actress of the year: Juliana Alves (Suellen, from Caminho das Índias, Globo)
 Television Journalism: Joyce Ribeiro (Jornal do SBT, SBT)
 Presenter of the Year: Alexandre Henderson (Globo Ciência, Globo)
 Male athlete: Adriano (Flamengo soccer player)
 Female Sportswoman: Marta (Santos soccer player)
 Pagan Group: Exaltasamba
 Singer: Alexandre Pires
 Singer: Vanessa da Mata
 Rap: Marcelo D2

Whole of the Work
 Elza Soares
 Leny Andrade
 Zezé Motta
 Osvaldinho da Cuíca
 Mestre Tadeu
 Paulinho da Viola
 Martinho da Vila
 Journalist Gloria Maria
 Journalist Ana Paula Padrão
 Roberto Carlos - Storyteller
 Taís Araújo

Artist of the Year
 Seu Jorge

Special Award
 Manoel Carlos, for the black cast placed in the novel Viver a Vida.

Institutional Category
 José Serra - Governor of São Paulo
 Lázaro Brandão - Chairman of the Board of Directors of Bradesco
 Orlando Silva - Minister of Sports
 Juca Ferreira - Minister of Culture
 Edson Santos - Minister of Racial Equality
 Luciano Coutinho - President of BNDES
 Julio Cesar Alves de Oliveira - President of Banco do Brasil Vehicles
 José Lima - President of Petrobras Distribuidora
 Helio dos Santos - Mayor of Campinas
 Nelson Narciso - Director of the National Petroleum Agency
 Vereadora Olívia Santana

2008
 Sportsman of the Year Category 
 Maurren Higa Maggi, athlete, Gold Medal Salto Distance in Beijing
 
 Category International 
 Larry Palmer - President of the Inter-American Foundation
 Billy Paul - North American singer
 
 Revelation Category 
 Fabrício Boliveira, actor 
 
 Institutional Category 
 Adriano Lima - Itaú Representing President Roberto Setúbal
 Benedito Gonçalves, Minister of STJ 
 Clifford Sobel, Ambassador of the USA 
 Cristovam Buarque, Senator 
 Edgar Martolio, editor of Caras Magazine 
 Edson Santos, Minister of Seppir 
 Erickson Gavazza, Judge 
 Fabio Barbosa, President of Banco Santander in Brazil 
 Fernando Haddad, Minister of Education 
 Gabriel Jorge Ferreira - Unibanco Representing President Pedro Salles
 Gilberto Kassab - Mayor of the City of São Paulo
 José Luis Bueno - Director Human Resources Bradesco
 José Sarney, Senator 
 Laura Gold - American consul representing the American Consulate in honor of Barack Obama, who also received a congratulatory plaque for his election
 Mário Hélio Souza - President of Fundação Bradesco
 Miguel Jorge, Minister of Industry, Commerce and Development 
 Nélio Alfano Moura, physical trainer of Maurren 
 Ruth Guimarães, Writer 
 
 Lifetime work 
 Carlos Ayres Britto, Minister of Supreme Federal Tribunal
 Daiane dos Santos, athlete 
 Erickson Gavazza, Judge 
 Jamelão Neto, grandson of Jamelão
 Joaquim Barbosa, Minister of STF 
 Marcelo Paixão - State University of Rio de Janeiro, Deputy Director of Graduation
 Maria Helena Guimarães, Secretary of Education of the State of São Paulo
 Milton Gonçalves, actor 
 Netinho de Paula - Cantor, Alderman elected São Paulo
 Orlando Silva - Minister of Sports
 Sandra de Sá - Singer
 Zezé Motta, actress

2007
 Popular Vote
 Writer: Valquíria Ribeiro (novel "Opposite Lives") / Sheron Menezes (novel "Duas Caras" - Special Tribute)  
 Humor: Sérgio Lorosa (program "A diarist")  
 Singer (female): Category not announced  
 Singer (male): Jairzinho  
 ACTOR: Déo Garces (novel "Paths of the Heart")  
 Actress of the Year: Camila Pitanga (novel "Tropical Paradise")  
 Actress of the Year: André Ramiro (film "Tropa de Elite")  
 Sportsperson of the Year: Diogo Silva (Taekwondo) 
 
 Institutional Categories
 Mac Maharaj, Former guerrilla fighter at the African National Congress against Apartheid and former South African Transport Minister  
 Benedito Gonçalves - Jurist Federal Judge of the Second Federal Court of the State of Rio de Janeiro  
 Benedita da Silva - Former governor of Rio de Janeiro  
 Matilde Ribeiro - Minister of the Special Secretariat for Policies for the Promotion of Racial Equality (SEPPIR)  
 Janete Rocha Pietá - Federal Deputy  
 Almir de Souza Maia - Former Rector of the Methodist University of Piracicaba - creator of the first project of inclusion of blacks in higher education and partner of Unipalmares  
 Orlando Silva Junior - Minister of Sports  
 José Vicente, president of Afrobras - Sociedade Afrobrasileira de Desenvolvimento Socio Cultural and dean of Unipalmares - University of Citizenship Zumbi dos Palmares

2006
 Emilson Alonso, president of HSBC
 Márcio Cypriano, president of Febraban (Brazilian Federation of Banks) and Bradesco
 Janete Pietá, elected federal deputy
 Fernando Haddad, Minister of Education
 Lygia Santos, president of MIS-RJ (Museum of Image and Sound of Rio de Janeiro)
 Robson Caetano, athlete

 Popular Vote
 
 Actress - Elisa Lucinda (Life Pages)
 Actor - Ronnie Marruda (Soul Mate)
 Sambista - Jorge Aragão / Ivone Lara (Special Feature)
 Cantor - Léo Maia
 Singer - Paula Lima
 Humor - Alligator (The Class of Didi)
 Grupo Musical - Backyard Fund / Negritude Jr. (Special Highlight)
 Sportsman - Daiane dos Santos / Alessandra Oliveira (Special Feature)
 
 Institutional
 Benedita da Silva - Former Governor of Rio de Janeiro
 Carlos Alberto de Paula - Minister of the Superior Labor Court
 Carlos Alberto Vieira - President of Banco Safra
 Celso Luiz Limongi, president of the São Paulo Court of Justice
 Chico Pinheiro - Journalist
 Cristopher McMullen - United States Consul General
 David Uip, executive director of Incor (Heart Institute)
 Eduardo Suplicy - Senador-SP
 Eunice Prudente - Secretary of Justice and Defense of Citizenship of the State of São Paulo
 Gabriel Jorge Ferreira, president of the National Confederation of Financial Institutions
 Glaucia Marote Ferro - Director of the Alumni Group
 Gustavo Petta, president of UNE (National Union of Students)
 João Carlos di Genio, president of the Objective and Unip
 Joaquim Benedito Barbosa Gomes - Minister of the Supreme Federal Court
 Luiz Fux, minister of the STJ (Superior Court of Justice)
 Luiz Antonio Marrey, Secretary of Legal Affairs of the City of São Paulo
 Massami Uyeda - Minister of the Supreme Court of Justice
 Matilde Ribeiro - Minister of Seppir - Special Secretariat for Policies to Promote Racial Equality
 Milú Villela, president of the Instituto Fazer Parte and the MAM (Museum of Modern Art)
 Orlando Silva Jr., Minister of Sports
 Octavio Frias de Oliveira, President of the Grupo Folha de S.Paulo
 Sandra Lia Simón, attorney general of the Federal Public Labor Ministry
 Vicente Paulo da Silva, federal deputy
 
 Highlights 2006
 Taís Araújo and Lazaro Ramos (Cobras & Lagartos) - Actors
 
 Posthumous Homage
 Sandra Nascimento - Vereadora - Santos

2004
 CANTOR: Luis Melodia
 CANTORA: Luciana Mello
 SAMBISTA: Lecí Brandão
 MUSICAL GROUP: Black and White Quintet
 POLITICAL CAREER: Paulo Paim
 ACTOR: Rocco Pitanga (novel "Da color do Pecado") and Lázaro Ramos (movie "My uncle killed a face")
 ATRIZ: Taís Araújo (novel "Da cor do Pecado") and Isabel Fillardis (novel "Beginning of New")
 REVELATION: Adriana Alves (soap opera "Celebrity") and Preta Gil (singer)
 SPORTS OF THE YEAR: Daiane dos Santos

2000
 Alceu Collares 
 Albuíno Azeredo
 Camila Pitanga
 Antonio Pitanga
 Ruth de Souza
 Vincente
 Edvaldo Brito
 Zezé Motta
 Joãozinho Trinta
 Pelé
 Marta Sobral
 Viviane Porto
 Jorge Lafond
 Nelson Xavier
 Paulinho da Viola

References

External links
 Troféu Raça Negra 2018 page (

Afro-Brazilian culture
Awards established in 2000
Brazilian awards